Prathyusha (29 August 1981 – 23 February 2002) was an Indian actress who appeared in Telugu and Tamil language films.

Early life and film career
Pratyusha was born in Bhongir of present-day Telangana into a middle-class family. Her mother, Mrs. Sarojini Devi, is a government school teacher. Her brother is Praneet Chandra (also known as Krishna Chandra).

Pratyusha was schooled at Santosh Vidhya Niketan, Bhuvanagiri, Prakash Public School, Miryalaguda and later at St. Anns High School, Tarnaka, Hyderabad.

Pratyusha completed her intermediate from Gouthami Residential Academy, S.R.Nagar and graduation in Bachelor of Hotel Management at Banjara Hills and JB Institute of Hotel Management.

Pratyusha participated in Television Star 2000 Contest and was crowned Ms. Lovely Smile. Her success in the contest paved way to enter the film world. She had signed for a Kannada film before she died.

Pratyusha's final release was the delayed 2004 Sathyaraj film Sound Party, for which she got good reviews.

Death
Prathyusha died on 23 February 2002 after allegedly attempting suicide by consuming poison along with her friend Siddharth, reportedly after their family members rejected their marriage proposal. Some reports say it is murder. Pratyusha died while undergoing treatment at Care Hospital, while Siddartha recovered after treatment. The case was widely discussed in the media and attracted public attention as some big shots of then ruling party are involved in this case. the suspicion of murder arose on Siddhartha, and after a forensic expert opined that the cause of her death was 'asphyxia due to manual strangulation'. The report was referred to Professor T D Dogra, an eminent forensic expert and Head of Forensic Division, at All India Institute of Medical Sciences New Delhi. The doctor's report was then found to be faulty. In 2004, Siddhartha was sentenced to five years' imprisonment and to pay a fine of Rs. 6,000 as he was found guilty of suicide attempt and abetting Pratyusha to commit suicide.

After her death, her mother started a charity in her name.

Filmography

References

External links
 
 

Indian film actresses
Actresses in Tamil cinema
2002 deaths
1981 births
People from Nalgonda district
20th-century Indian actresses
21st-century Indian actresses
Actresses in Telugu cinema
Actresses from Telangana
2002 suicides
Suicides in India
Suicides by poison
Artists who committed suicide
Female suicides